= Nordic Adult Entertainment =

Danish-Swedish adult entertainment company

Nordic Adult Entertainment is a Danish/Swedish company producing erotic adult film.

== History ==
The business was founded 1972 by Leif Aage Hagen in Norway as a mail order business selling adult magazines, toys and films. From 1976 the company published Rapport 76 (later called Aktuell Rapport). The business was founded as a public company, Scandinavian Publishing Group A/S in Denmark in 1985 and went on to produce magazines covering sex and erotica, cars, rock music, softcore entertainment, home furnishing and design. In the late 1980s Leif Aage Hagen sold of the company but remained as chairman of the board. By the late 1990s the focus was concentrated on pure erotica and pornography content alone. In 2007 the company was sold to two employees, CEO Danish Lau Laursen and Anders Brodin and a third person, a private investor.

== Activity ==
By 2009 the company has businesses and subsidiaries with production in Sweden, Denmark, Norway and the Netherlands and claims to 60 employees with a turnover of more than 20 million Euros and to have sold about 140 million magazines and books - and produced more than 250 movies with erotic content.

The company currently

- operates numerous web activities including the webshop martinshop and a dating service, ix.nu claiming to have 265.000 members
- has shop outlets in Oslo, Stockholm, Göteborg, Helsingborg and Ullared.
- publishes a number of magazines including Aktuell Rapport, Cats Magazine and a Swedish version of Hustler.
